Ecotechnics is defined as the 'techne' of bodies. Ecotechnics thinks of the body as a technology which makes possible the inclusion of a whole new range of bodies. This gives people more agency and biopower over their own use of their bodies. This makes it usable for queer theory and disability studies. An interpretation also refers to the term as the craft of the home.

In classifying the body as a technical object, Jean-Luc Nancy explained how it works by partitioning bodies into their own zones and spaces, which also allow such bodies to connect with other bodies. Hence, Nancy claims that technology determine our interactions with other beings in the world. Ecotechnics is also central in Sullivan's and Murray's collection of essays Queering the Technologisation of Bodies. It is built on Bernard Stiegler's work that sees the body and technology as a double process: the technology and the body are informed by each other. Derrida who extends on both Nancy and Stiegler's ideas argues that the 'proper body' implicates interconnections of technical additions. Ecotechnics goes against the essentialist and binary notion of the body as a technological object which positions it within post-structuralism. The body can only be understood within its environment and this environment is a technical one.

Nancy also applied the ecotechnics concept to contemporary issues such as war and globalization. He maintained, for instance, that modern conflicts are produced by the dividing lines between: North and South; rich and poor; and, integrated and excluded. He also believes that ecotechnics is undoing communities due to the elimination of the polis and the prevalence of oikos, calling for a global sovereignty that would administer the world as a single household.

See also 
 Institute of Ecotechnics

References
 

Post-structuralism
Queer theory